The 2022 Rhode Island House of Representatives elections took place as part of the biennial United States elections. Rhode Island voters elected all 75 state representatives. State representatives served two-year terms in the Rhode Island House of Representatives.

Background 
Postal voting became easier for voters after a bill passed in the State House in May 2022.

Incumbent representatives

Predictions

See also 

 2022 United States elections
 2022 United States House of Representatives elections in Rhode Island
 2022 Rhode Island Senate election

References 

House
Rhode Island House
Rhode Island House of Representatives elections